Linda Keith (born 1946) is a former British fashion model, best known for her work for Vogue magazine during the 1960s as well as her involvement in the rock music scene.

Biography
Linda Keith was born to Pearl Rebuck and Alan Keith, a British actor and radio presenter who objected to her career as a fashion model. While working for Vogue, Linda dated Keith Richards and spent time living in New York City where she frequented the clubs in Greenwich Village. She helped discover Jimi Hendrix by introducing him to Chas Chandler. She was also the first cousin of Free guitarist Paul Kossoff.

In the mid-1960s Keith became well connected culturally in the early days of the "Swinging Sixties". She was photographed by David Bailey and, together with Sheila Klein, partner of the Rolling Stones' manager Andrew Loog Oldham, was at the heart of a bohemian community in London's West Hampstead. She formed relationships with Keith Richards of the Stones and, later in New York City, Jimi Hendrix, but drifted into drug dependency. Richards appears to have been instrumental in Alan Keith's going out to America to find his daughter. On their return she was made a ward of court. She later brought up her own family and, in 2010, was living in New Orleans. According to Richards, Linda Keith was the subject of the Rolling Stones song "Ruby Tuesday". The song includes the lyrics "[w]hen you change with every new day / Still I'm gonna miss you".

In the film Jimi: All Is by My Side it is suggested Jimi Hendrix also wrote the song "Red House" about Linda.

References 

British female models
English people of Russian-Jewish descent
Living people
Place of birth missing (living people)
Kossoff family
1946 births
Muses